Selfridge High School is a public high school located in Selfridge, North Dakota on the Standing Rock Indian Reservation. It currently serves over 50 students and is a part of the Selfridge Public School District system. The official school colors are white, black, orange and the athletic teams are known as "The Chieftains".

The mission of Selfridge High School is to enhance student achievement and promote quality learning that is functional, stimulating, collaborative, individualized and appreciative.

References

External links
Selfridge High School, NDHAA
Student Enrollment

Public high schools in North Dakota
North Dakota High School Activities Association (Class B)
North Dakota High School Activities Association (Class A Football)
Schools in Sioux County, North Dakota
Public middle schools in North Dakota